The Natya class, Soviet designation Project 266M Akvamarin, were a group of minesweepers built for the Soviet Navy and export customers during the 1970s and 1980s. The ships were used for ocean minesweeping.

Design
A stern ramp made recovering sweeps easier. The hull was built of low magnetic steel. The engines were mounted on sound dampening beams and shrouded propellers were used to reduce noise. An electrical field compensator was also installed. A single ship designated Natya 2 by NATO was built with an aluminium hull for reduced magnetic signature.

Project 02668
 Displacement: 852 tons. 
 Armament: 1 × 30mm AK-306 CIWS, 2 × 14.5 mm MTPU-1 machine guns, BKT high-speed pin sweep, TEM-4 electromagnetic sweep, AT-3 acoustic sweep, SZ-1 or SZ-2 depth charges, "Livadia" mine detector-finder. 
 Crew: 60.

Project 02668 was designed by Design Bureau "Almaz" and is a prototype, which demonstrates the latest technology - the logical continuation of a series of Project 266ME. The minesweeper is equipped with the most modern means of anti-mine protection. It was the first Russian mine-sweeping ship to have an integrated navigation bridge and main command center, as well as the "Diez-E" automated control system of anti-mine action activities.

The St. Andrew's flag-raising ceremony was held on 17 January 2009, and the ship was accepted into the Russian Black Sea Fleet.

Operators
45 ships were built for the Soviet Navy from 1970 to 1982.

7 ships believed to remain in service.
Black Sea Fleet - 3 ships
Pacific Fleet - 2 ships
Northern Fleet - 2 ships

2 captured by Russia.
U310 Chernihiv (ex-Zenitchik - captured)
U311 Cherkasy (captured)

12 ships built for the Indian Navy in two batches between 1978 and 1988. Ship design was modified to Indian specifications. Known as the Pondicherry-class minesweeper in Indian service. All have since been decommissioned. These ships were to be replaced by Future Indian minehunter class, but the project is currently on hold.

8 ships transferred 1981-86. 2 still in active

 Libyan People's Army
2 ships captured in February 2011.

One ship in 1986.

 
One ship.

See also
List of ships of the Soviet Navy
List of ships of Russia by project number

References

 Also published as 

Mine warfare vessel classes
 
 
Minesweepers of the Russian Navy
 
Minesweepers of the Ukrainian Navy
Minesweepers of Ukraine
Minesweepers of the Libyan Navy
Minesweepers of the Syrian Navy
Minesweepers of the Yemen Navy